"The Fifth Modernization" is an essay by human rights activist Wei Jingsheng, originally begun as a signed wall poster placed on the Democracy Wall in Beijing on December 5, 1978.

Summary
The poster called on the Chinese Communist Party to add democracy to the list of Four Modernizations which includes industry, agriculture, science and technology and national defense.  It openly stated democracy as an additional modernization which needs to be taken if China truly wants to modernize itself.  The five Modernizations would include:

Democracy
Agriculture
Industry
National Defense
Science and Technology

See also
Beijing Spring
Democracy Wall

References

External links
The Fifth Modernization essay by Wei Jingsheng

Ideology of the Chinese Communist Party
Economic history of the People's Republic of China
Chinese democracy movements
1978 essays
1978 in China